Route 540 is a  long provincial highway located in western New Brunswick, Canada. The highway begins in Graham Corner at a junction with Route 122 and travels north to a terminus at Route 550 in Lindsay.

Route description
Route 540 begins in Graham Corner, near Eel River Lake, and travels north through rural woodlands in northern York County, passing through the community of Maxwell, and by Belle Lake. The highway continues north, into Carleton County and the community of Kirkland, where the woodlands give way to farmland. The highways first junction with another numbered highway occurs south of Richmond Corner, with Route 555, then just north of Richmond Corner with Route 95, which provides access to Maine and to Woodstock and the Trans-Canada Highway. Past Route 95, the highway continues through several small communities and rural farm land, before turning east near Oakville. The highway comes to an end in Lindsay at an intersection with Route 550.

Major intersections

References

540
540
540